April Boys were a Filipino boy band whose members were brothers Vingo and Jimmy Regino. Older brother April Boy Regino was also a member upon the group's formation in 1993. He appeared on their first album before leaving to become a solo artist in 1995.

History
After returning to the Philippines in 1993, April Boy Regino, together with his brothers Vingo and Jimmy, formed the musical group April Boys. Their debut song, "Sana'y Laging Magkapiling" from their debut album Dugong Pilipino became popular. However, in 1995, April Boy Regino left the group to pursue a solo career before signing to the label Ivory Records (now Ivory Music & Video). In a 2015 interview with Jessica Soho, he explained that the brothers competed amongst themselves which led to a falling out, but they later reconciled.

Vingo and Jimmy released their first album as a duo, the self-titled April Boys in 1995 containing the songs "Ikaw Pa Rin ang Mamahalin", "Sana ay Mahalin Mo Rin Ako" and "Tunay na Pag-Ibig" under Vicor Music, followed by the Christmas album, Tanging Hiling Sa Pasko.

In 1996, the duo were given a shot at acting, co-starring alongside Nida Blanca, Vina Morales, Donita Rose and Candy Pangilinan in the romantic film April Boys: Sana'y Mahalin Mo Rin Ako, produced by Viva Films. The duo's next album was Sana'y Tanggapin ang Pag-ibig Ko.

In 1997, they released the album Ganyan Talaga Ang... April Boys which contains the Tagalog/English cover version of the song いとしのエリー("Itoshi no Ellie"), renamed "Honey My Love So Sweet".

In 2004, the duo had disbanded and they moved to the United States, while April Boy Regino also migrated there a year later. 

In 2020, the original three-member boy band reunited for the last time after 25 years for live concerts in San Diego, California on March 14 and in Las Vegas, Nevada on March 28.

April Boy Regino died on November 29, 2020, at the age of 59, as confirmed by his brother, Vingo. He was diagnosed with chronic kidney disease and acute respiratory failure prior to his death.

Members
Vingo Regino - lead vocals (1993–2004, 2020)
Jimmy Regino - backing vocals (1993–2004, 2020)
April Boy Regino - lead vocals (1993–1995, 2020)

Discography

Studio albums
 Dugong Pilipino (1993)
 April Boys (1995)
 Tanging Hiling Sa Pasko (1995)
 Sana'y Tanggapin ang Pag-ibig Ko (1996)
 Ganyan Talaga Ang... April Boys (1997)
 April Boys 5 (1998)
 Tayong Dalawa Pa Rin (1999)
 Labs Kita (2002)
 U2L Utol (2003)
 Oo at Hindi (2004)

Compilation albums
 Megahits (1999)
 Sana ay Magbalik (2006)
 The Best Of April Boys (2004)

Songs
 "Sana'y Laging Makapiling" (1993)
 "Dugong Pilipino" (1993)
 "Giliw Ko" (1993)
 "Ikaw Pa Rin ang Mamahalin" (1995)
 "Pag-Ibig Kong Litong-Lito" (1995)
 "Sana ay Mahalin Mo Rin Ako" (1995)
 "Tunay na Pag-Ibig" (1995)
 "Tanging Hiling Sa Pasko" (1995)
 "Nalilimutan Na ang Pasko" (1995)
 "May Hirap, May Sarap Sa Pasko" (1995)
 "Merry Christmas Sa'yo Lab Ko" (1995) 
 "Di Kita Ma-Reach" (1996)
 "Sana'y Tanggapin ang Pag-Ibig Ko" (1996)
 "Pag-Ibig Mo, Langit Ko" (1996)
 "Ganyan Talaga ang Pag-Ibig" (1997)
 "Honey My Love (So Sweet)" (1997)
 "Nakapagtataka" (1998)
 "Parang 'Di Ko Na Kaya" (1998)
 "April Boys Mega Medley/Tunay na Pag-Ibig (Mega Medley)" (1999)
 "Tayong Dalawa Pa Rin" (1999)
 "Mapagmahal Ako" (1999)
 "Sana ay Magbalik" (1999)
 "Paulit-Ulit" (1999)
 "Pag-Ibig ang Gamot" (1999)
 "Naaalala Ka" (1999)
 "Sayo Lang Na-In Lab" (1999)
 "Labs Kita" (2002)
 "Sweetheart Lab Na Lab Kita" (2002)
 "Baby I'm Sorry" (2002)
 "Kahit Mahirap Lang" (2003)
 "Nagmamahal na Tapat" (2003)
 "DJ na Aking Radyo" (2003)
 "Pa-Promise Promise" (2003)
 "Oo at Hindi" (2004)
 "Kahit Sana Sandali" (2004)
 "Pogi Naman Ako" (2004)
 "Mahal Mo Pala Ako" (2004)
 "Nakilala Kong Pag-Ibig" (2004)
 "Marami" (2004)

References

1993 establishments in the Philippines
2004 disestablishments in the Philippines
Filipino boy bands
Filipino pop music groups
Filipino musical duos
Male musical duos
Musical groups established in 1993
Musical groups disestablished in 2004
Musical groups from Metro Manila
People from Marikina
Sibling musical groups
Vocal trios
Vicor Music artists